A gas stove is a stove that is fuelled by combustible gas such as syngas, natural gas, propane, butane, liquefied petroleum gas or other flammable gas. Before the advent of gas, cooking stoves relied on solid fuels such as coal or wood. The first gas stoves were developed in the 1820s and a gas stove factory was established in England in 1836. This new cooking technology had the advantage of being easily adjustable and could be turned off when not in use. The gas stove, however, did not become a commercial success until the 1880s, by which time supplies of piped gas were available in cities and large towns in Britain. The stoves became widespread on the European Continent and in the United States in the early 20th century.

Gas stoves became more common when the oven was integrated into the base and the size was reduced to better fit in with the rest of the kitchen furniture. By the 1910s, producers started to enamel their gas stoves for easier cleaning. Ignition of the gas was originally by match and this was followed by the more convenient pilot light. This had the disadvantage of continually consuming gas. The oven still needed to be lit by match and accidentally turning on the gas without igniting it could lead to an explosion. To prevent these types of accidents, oven manufacturers developed and installed a safety valve called a flame failure device for gas hobs (cooktops) and ovens. Most modern gas stoves have electronic ignition, automatic timers for the oven and extractor hoods to remove fumes.

Gas stoves are a significant source of indoor air pollution, and require good ventilation to maintain acceptable air quality. They have been linked to increases in the rate of asthma in children, although these studies may be at odds with an earlier one in 2013. Gas stoves also release methane. Research in 2022 estimated that the methane emissions from gas stoves in the United States were equivalent to the greenhouse gas emissions of 500,000 cars. About 80% of methane emissions were found to occur even when stoves are turned off, as the result of tiny leaks in gas lines and fittings. Although methane contains less carbon than other fuels, gas venting and unintended fugitive emissions throughout the supply chain results in natural gas having a similar carbon footprint to other fossil fuels overall.

History 

The first gas stove was developed in 1802 by Zachäus Winzler (de), but this along with other attempts remained isolated experiments. James Sharp patented a gas stove in Northampton, England in 1826 and opened a gas stove factory in 1836. His invention was marketed by the firm Smith & Philips from 1828. An important figure in the early acceptance of this new technology, was Alexis Soyer, the renowned chef at the Reform Club in London. From 1841, he converted his kitchen to consume piped gas, arguing that gas was cheaper overall because the supply could be turned off when the stove was not in use.

A gas stove was shown at the Great Exhibition in London in 1851, but it was only in the 1880s that the technology became a commercial success in England. By that stage a large and reliable network for gas pipeline transport had spread over much of the country, making gas relatively cheap and efficient for domestic use. Gas stoves only became widespread on the European Continent and in the United States in the early 20th century.

Early gas stoves were rather unwieldy, but soon the oven was integrated into the base and the size was reduced to fit in better with the rest of the kitchen furniture. By the early 1920s, gas stoves with enameled porcelain finishes for easier cleaning had become widely available, along with heavy use of insulation for fuel-efficiency.

Ignition 

Gas stoves today use two basic types of ignition sources, standing pilot and electric. A stove with a standing pilot has a small, continuously burning gas flame (called a pilot light) under the cooktop. The flame is between the front and back burners. When the stove is turned on, this flame lights the gas flowing out of the burners. The advantage of the standing pilot system is that it is simple and completely independent of any outside power source. A minor drawback is that the flames continuously consume fuel even when the stove is not in use. Early gas ovens did not have a pilot. One had to light these manually with a match. If one accidentally left the gas on, gas would fill the oven and eventually the room. A small spark, such as an arc from a light switch being turned on, could ignite the gas, triggering a violent explosion. To prevent these types of accidents, oven manufacturers developed and installed a safety valve called a flame failure device for gas hobs (cooktops) and ovens. The safety valve depends on a thermocouple that sends a signal to the valve to stay open. Although most modern gas stoves have electronic ignition, many households have gas cooking ranges and ovens that need to be lit with a flame. Electric ignition stoves use electric sparks to ignite the surface burners. This is the "clicking sound" audible just before the burner actually lights. The sparks are initiated by turning the gas burner knob to a position typically labeled "LITE" or by pressing the 'ignition' button. Once the burner lights, the knob is turned further to modulate the flame size. Auto reignition is an elegant refinement: the user need not know or understand the wait-then-turn sequence. They simply turn the burner knob to the desired flame size and the sparking is turned off automatically when the flame lights. Auto reignition also provides a safety feature: the flame will be automatically reignited if the flame goes out while the gas is still on—for example by a gust of wind. If the power fails, surface burners must be manually match-lit.

Electric ignition for ovens uses a "hot surface" or "glow bar" ignitor. Basically it is a heating element that heats up to gas's ignition temperature. A sensor detects when the glow bar is hot enough and opens the gas valve.

Also stoves with electric ignition must be connected with gas protection mechanisms such as gas control breaker. Because of this many manufacturers supply stoves without electricity plug.

Features

Burner heat 
One of the important properties of a gas stove is the heat emitted by the burners. Burner heat is typically specified in terms of kilowatts or British Thermal Units per hour and is directly based on the gas consumption rather than heat absorbed by pans.

Often, a gas stove will have burners with different heat output ratings. For example, a gas cooktop may have a high output burner, often in the range , and a mixture of medium output burners, 1.5 to 3 kW, and low output burners, 1 kW or less. The high output burner is suitable for boiling a large pot of water quickly, sautéing and searing, while the low output burners are good for simmering.

These may be desired for preparing large quantities or special types of food and enable certain advanced cooking techniques. However, these burners produce greater emissions and necessitate better ventilation for safe operation. Higher capacity burners may not benefit every potential user or dish.

Design and layout 
In the last few years, appliance manufacturers have been making innovative changes to the design and layout of gas stoves. Most of the modern cooktops have come with lattice structure which usually covers the complete range of the top, enabling sliding of cookware from one burner to another without lifting the containers over the gaps of cooktop. Some modern gas stoves also have central fifth burner or an integrated griddle in between the outer burners.

Size 
Almost all the manufacturers have been developing several range of options in size range. Combination of range and oven are also available which usually come in two styles: slide in and freestanding. 

Usually, there isn't much of a style difference in between them. Slide-in come with lips on their either side and controls over the front along with burner controls. Freestanding gas range cooktops have solid slides and controls placed behind the cooktop.

Oven 

Many stoves have integrated ovens. Modern ovens often include a convection fan inside the oven to provide even air circulation and let the food cook evenly. Some modern ovens come with temperature sensors which allows close control of baking, automatically shut off after reaching certain temperature, or hold on to particular temperature through the cooking process. Ovens may also have two separate oven bays which allows cooking of two different dishes at the same time.

Programmable controls 

Many gas stoves come with at least few modern programmable controls to make the handling easier. LCD displays and some other complex cooking routines are some of the standard features present in most of the basic and high-end manufacturing models. Some of the other programmable controls include precise pre-heating, automatic pizza, cook timers and others.

Safety factors 

Modern gas stove ranges are safer than older models. Two of the major safety concerns with gas stoves are child-safe controls and accidental ignition. Some gas cooktops have knobs which can be accidentally switched on even with a gentle bump.

Gas stoves are at risk of overheating when frying oil, raising the oil temperature to the auto-ignition point and creating an oil fire on the stove. Japan, South Korea and China have regulated the addition of electronic safety devices to prevent pan overheating. The devices use a thermistor to monitor the temperature close to the pan, and cut off the gas supply if the heat is too high. Fire loss statistics for Japanese gas stoves showed a reduction in house fires caused by gas stoves in the years following 2008, when the safety devices were mandated.

Efficiency 
The U.S. Department of Energy (DOE) ran tests in 2014 of cooktop energy transfer efficiency, simulating cooking while testing what percentage of a cooktop's energy is transferred to a test block. Gas had an efficiency of 43.9%, with ±0.5% repeatability in the measurement. This level of efficiency is only possible if the pan is big enough for the burner.

Japanese gas flames are angled upwards towards the pot to increase efficiency. The efficiency of gas appliances can be raised by using special pots with heatsink-like fins. Jetboil manufactures pots for portable stoves that use a corrugated ribbon to increase efficiency.

Health concerns 
Carbon monoxide, formaldehyde, and nitrogen dioxide from gas stoves contribute to indoor air pollution. Nitrogen dioxide can exacerbate respiratory illnesses, such as asthma or chronic obstructive pulmonary disease. Studies have been performed correlating childhood asthma and gas stoves. A 1999–2004 study published in The Lancet Respiratory Medicine found "no evidence of an association between the use of gas as a cooking fuel and either asthma symptoms or asthma diagnosis". A 2013 meta-analysis concluded that gas cooking increases the risk of asthma in children. A 2020 Lancet systematic review surveyed 31 studies on gas cooking or heating, finding a pooled risk ratio of 1.17 for asthma. One study found that in households with gas stoves those that report using ventilation had lower rates of asthma than those that did not. A 2023 meta-analysis estimated that in the United States, one in eight cases of asthma in children are due to pollution from gas stoves. The asthma risk caused by gas stove exposure is similar in magnitude to that caused by secondhand smoke from tobacco. Stoves can cause levels of nitrogen dioxide that can exceed outdoor safety standards. A 2020 RMI report found pollution from gas stoves causes exacerbation of asthma symptoms in children.

Cooking, especially high heat frying, releases smoke (measured as fine particulate matter), acrolein and polycyclic aromatic hydrocarbons. Mitigating indoor particulate  pollution can involve running a range hood, opening a kitchen window, and running an air purifier. Range hoods are more effective at capturing and removing pollution on the rear burners than the front burners. California requires gas stoves to have higher levels of ventilation than electric stoves due to the nitrogen dioxide risk. Range hoods can be run for 15 minutes after cooking to reduce pollution. The U.S. Consumer Product Safety Commission is investigating reducing the health effects of gas stoves, including emissions and ventilation standards.

One study of pipelines in Boston found that natural gas contains non-methane impurities including heptane, hexane, cyclohexane, benzene and toluene.

Climate impact 
Gas stoves are often run on natural gas. The extraction and consumption of natural gas is a major and growing contributor to climate change.  Both the gas itself (specifically methane) and carbon dioxide, which is released when natural gas is burned, are greenhouse gases. In 2022, a research group investigated leakage in 53 homes in California and estimated the methane emissions from gas stoves in the United States were equivalent over a 20 year period to the greenhouse gas emissions of 500,000 cars. About 80% of methane emissions occur when stoves are turned off, as the result of leaks in gas lines and fittings. 

Some places, such as the Australian Capital Territory, have curtailed installation of gas stoves and appliances in new construction, for reasons of health, indoor air quality, and climate protection.

Many electrification codes exempt commercial kitchens.

See also 

 Auto reignition
 Electric stove
 List of stoves

References

External links

Burners
Stoves
Gas technologies